Gaston Salasiwa (born 17 August 1988) is a Dutch professional footballer who plays as a midfielder.

Career
Salasiwa, who is of Indonesian-Moluccan descent, was born in Zaandam and played in his youth for WFC Wormerveer, KFC Koog aan de Zaan, Ajax and AZ. In his professional debut on 16 January 2009 for Telstar, Salasiwa scored twice and assisted in the 1–4 away match against FC Eindhoven. Before his first match at Telstar, Salasiwa had practiced several times with AZ's first team, but had not yet made his competitive debut. In the 2010–11 season, Salasiwa left for Bintang Medan in the Liga Primer Indonesia, a club, which, after dissolving in 2011, changed its name to PSMS Medan. After two years in Indonesia, he returned to Telstar. From the 2014–15 season, Salasiwa played for Almere City FC. In mid-2018, he moved to Notodden FK in Norway. His contract expired at the end of 2019, making him a free agent. In September 2020 he continued his career at MVV Maastricht in the second-tier Eerste Divisie.

References

External links
 

1986 births
Living people
Dutch footballers
Dutch expatriate footballers
Footballers from Zaanstad
AFC Ajax players
AZ Alkmaar players
SC Telstar players
Almere City FC players
Notodden FK players
MVV Maastricht players
Eerste Divisie players
Norwegian First Division players
Dutch people of Indonesian descent
Dutch people of Moluccan descent
Association football defenders
Association football midfielders
Expatriate footballers in Indonesia
Expatriate footballers in Norway
Dutch expatriate sportspeople in Indonesia
Dutch expatriate sportspeople in Norway